Kibby Pond is located southeast of Bakers Mills, New York. Fish species present in the lake are tiger trout, brook trout, and brown bullhead. There is a 2 mile trail off CR-8 to the west shore.

References

Lakes of New York (state)
Lakes of Warren County, New York